Charles Lambert was appointed Deputy Under Secretary for the United States Department of Agriculture Marketing and Regulatory Programs mission area by then-Agriculture Secretary Ann M. Veneman on December 2, 2002.

Personal life
Lambert was raised on a farm and cow-calf operation in west central Kansas.  Following graduation and active-duty service with the National Guard, Lambert worked on the family operation until 1979.

Education
Lambert graduated in 1969 from Kansas State University with a bachelor of science degree in animal science. He also received a master's degree in animal science with a minor in agricultural economics from that institution.  He later returned to Kansas State, earning a Ph.D. in economics with a specialization in agricultural policy and international trade in 1987.

Career
Lambert served for more than 15 years in various positions with the National Cattlemen's Beef Association, including chief economist for that organization.

In the U.S. Department of Agriculture, Lambert helped to oversee policy development and the day-to-day operations of the 3 agencies that comprise the Marketing and Regulatory Programs mission area: the Animal and Plant Health Inspection Service, the Agricultural Marketing Service, and the Grain Inspection, Packers, and Stockyards Administration. He testified before congress on terrorism and other issues.

When bovine spongiform encephalopathy was detected in December 2003, Lambert became a primary member of the team of USDA and Administration officials assembled to help reopen international markets to U.S. beef. Lambert served as USDA's principle representative to the National Invasive Species Council. He was an active member of USDA's biotechnology working group. In March 2004, Lambert led the U.S. delegation that participated in the first meeting of the parties to the Protocol on Biosafety, held in Kuala Lumpur.

References

American cattlemen
21st-century American economists
Living people
Kansas State University alumni
Year of birth missing (living people)